Institute of Cost and Management Accountants may refer to:

Institute of Cost and Management Accountants of Bangladesh
Institute of Cost and Management Accountants of Pakistan
Chartered Institute of Management Accountants, formerly the Institute of Cost and Management Accountants, a UK-based international organization